Pascal Barbot (born 7 June 1972) is a French chef. His restaurant L'Astrance in Paris has two Michelin stars as of 2021, and had three stars from 2007 to 2019. His restaurant was also listed for several years among The World's 50 Best Restaurants where he was ranked 13th in 2011.

Career 
After his  graduation from the hotel school of Vichy, Barbot began his cooking career at the Buron de Chaudefour in Chambon-sur-Lac, Puy-de-Dôme. He then went to Clermont-Ferrand and London at the restaurant Saveurs of Joël Antunes. In 1993, he did his national service in the Navy in New Caledonia, where he became the chef to the Pacific admiral.

From 1994 to 1998, he worked with Alain Passard in his restaurant L'Arpège in Paris. In 1996, the restaurant obtained a third star at the Michelin guide. In 2000, with Christophe Rohat,  also a former chef of L'Arpège, he opened the restaurant L'Astrance in Paris. The restaurant obtained a first Michelin star after five months, and the third one in 2007.

The 2019 edition of the Michelin guide removed one star for L'Astrance, which went back to two Michelin stars. In 2020, Barbot and Rohat moved the restaurant to a larger space.

Barbot has trained several female chefs of the new generation : Adeline Grattard, Tatiana Levha, Agata Felluga and Manon Fleury.

References

External links 
Official website of the restaurant L'Astrance

1972 births
Chefs from Paris
Head chefs of Michelin starred restaurants
Living people